Danraj Gopiesingh (born 13 February 1947) is a Trinidadian cricketer. He played in nine first-class matches for Trinidad and Tobago in 1976/77 and 1977/78.

See also
 List of Trinidadian representative cricketers

References

External links
 

1947 births
Living people
Trinidad and Tobago cricketers